Ionthoglossa is a genus of minute sea snails with left-handed shell-coiling, marine gastropod mollusks or micromollusks in the family Triphoridae.

Species
Species within the genus Ionthoglossa include:
 Ionthoglossa pseudocanarica (Bouchet, 1985)

References

Triphoridae